This is a list of mines in Newfoundland and Labrador, Canada..

References 

Newfoundland and Labrador
 
Mines